is a railway station in the city of Toyota, Aichi, Japan, operated by Meitetsu.

Lines
Sanage Station is a terminal station of the Meitetsu Mikawa Line and is 21.3 kilometers from the opposing terminus of the line at Chiryū Station.

Station layout
The station has a single island platform connected to the station building by a level crossing. The station has automated ticket machines, Manaca automated turnstiles and is staffed.

Platforms

Adjacent stations

|-
!colspan=5|Nagoya Railroad

Station history
Sanage Station was opened on October 31, 1924, as a station on the privately owned Mikawa Railway. The line was extended from Sanage to Shidare Station in 1927, and to Nishi-Nakagane Station in 1928. This extension was discontinued on April 1, 2004. The current station building was completed in 1932. The Mikawa Railway was merged with Meitetsu on June 1, 1941.

Passenger statistics
In fiscal 2017, the station was used by an average of 3988 passengers daily.

Surrounding area
 Toyota Athletic Stadium
 Sanage Agricultural High School
Sanagedai Junior High School

See also
 List of Railway Stations in Japan

References

External links

 Official web page 

Railway stations in Japan opened in 1924
Railway stations in Aichi Prefecture
Stations of Nagoya Railroad
Toyota, Aichi